A by-election was held for the New South Wales Legislative Assembly electorate of Liverpool Plains on 29 January 1870 because Charles Cowper had been appointed Premier and Colonial Secretary, forming the fifth Cowper ministry.

Dates

Result

Charles Cowper was appointed Premier and Colonial Secretary.

See also
Electoral results for the district of Liverpool Plains
List of New South Wales state by-elections

Notes

References

1870 elections in Australia
New South Wales state by-elections
1870s in New South Wales